Neoscona, known as spotted orb-weavers and barn spiders, is a genus of orb-weaver spiders (Araneidae) first described by Eugène Simon in 1895 to separate these from other araneids in the now obsolete genus Epeira.

Description
Neoscona species are among the most common spiders in North America and are found throughout most parts of the world. There are large variations in the dorsal patterns and coloration of the abdomen, even in a single species. Most have a light color with wavy edges along the mid-line, and darker swirls either side of that. Ventral abdominal patterns may consist of a dark area bordered by white, roughly forming a square. In adults the pattern can be faded. The venter of the abdomen is dark bordered on the sides by white spots.
Neoscona can be difficult to distinguish from species of Araneus without close examination of the carapace. Neoscona have a characteristic dorsal groove on the carapace that is parallel with the long axis of the body. The dorsal grooves of Araneus are transverse or angular, though they are sometimes so small that they appear as dimples on the dorsal surface. With the leg arrangement, the first are the longest, the second are second longest and the third are the shortest. The largest eyes are the anterior medians, next or subequal are posterior medians and the secondary eyes are slightly smaller. The webs are usually vertical with about twenty radii and an open hub at the centre. Some species have been recorded as retreating to a leaf during the day.

Species
 there are 123 species worldwide:

Gallery

References

External links

 Comparison of larger male orb-weavers of the United States and Canada at BugGuide
 N. crucifera and N. domiciliorum by the University of Florida

 
Araneomorphae genera
Cosmopolitan spiders
Taxa named by Eugène Simon